Sophia Turner (born 23 April 2003) is an English cricketer who currently plays for Lancashire and North West Thunder. She plays primarily as a right-arm medium bowler.

Early life
Turner was born on 23 April 2003 in Blackburn, Lancashire.

Domestic career
In 2020, Turner played for North West Thunder in the Rachael Heyhoe Flint Trophy. She appeared in two matches, scoring three runs overall.

In 2021, Turner was named as part of the Lancashire contingent of the North Representative XI squad for the Twenty20 Cup. She was the side's leading wicket-taker in the tournament, with 5 wickets at an average of 16.00. She also played four matches for North West Thunder in the 2021 Charlotte Edwards Cup, including bowling "brilliantly" in one match against Northern Diamonds to bowl four overs for four runs, with one wicket. 

She played for Lancashire in the 2022 Women's Twenty20 Cup, taking four wickets at an average of 30.50. She played also played five matches for North West Thunder in 2022, across the Charlotte Edwards Cup and the Rachael Heyhoe Flint Trophy, taking six wickets.

References

External links

2003 births
Living people
Cricketers from Blackburn
Lancashire women cricketers
North Representative XI cricketers
North West Thunder cricketers